Paracraspedothrix is a genus of flies in the family Tachinidae.

Species
Paracraspedothrix angulicornis (Curran, 1930)
Paracraspedothrix montivaga Villeneuve, 1920

References

Diptera of Europe
Diptera of North America
Exoristinae
Tachinidae genera
Taxa named by Joseph Villeneuve de Janti